Version is the second album by English record producer Mark Ronson, first released on 16 April 2007 through Allido and Columbia Records. It is an album of cover versions with a retro-inspired sound that Ronson considers to be reminiscent of Motown and Stax releases. The album cost more than £870,000 to launch. Version reached number 2 on the UK Albums Chart and has sold 105,584 copies as of January 2015.

Reception

Critical

Critical response to the album was generally positive. Billboard called Version "the massively enjoyable sound of a guy determined to not miss a minute of his moment." The New Statesman commented on "the record’s most essential qualities: warm-heartedness and a sense of fun." Rolling Stone gave the album three-out-of-five stars, calling Version "an audacious set of...leftfield covers...turned into dance-soul tracks. Despite the praise, the album inspired a number of mixed reviews. Rich Hughes gave it a 60% rating, saying that "whilst it was an admirable project and some of the results here are genuinely great, the misses just seem to dominate it." Michelle Dhillon called the album "a conglomeration of obvious singles, littered with distinctly horrible numbers that are better ignored."

In February 2008, Ronson received a BRIT Award for Best British Male Solo Artist over favourite Mika. He also performed a medley of 3 songs from the album, the most acclaimed being "Valerie" in which Amy Winehouse appeared. After the ceremony, Version soared from 22 to 4 in the UK Albums chart.

Commercial
Version debuted at number 2 in the UK. Overall, the album has spent 45 weeks in the UK Top 75, with 10 weeks in the top 10. In December 2007, the album was certified triple platinum in the UK for sales of over 900,000 copies. BBC Radio 1 listed the album as the 12th most successful of 2007 in the UK, outperforming the likes of Justin Timberlake, Foo Fighters, Nelly Furtado and Lily Allen. Version peaked at No. 129 on the Billboard 200. As of 2010, the album has sold 65,000 copies in United States.

The album was supported by the success of single "Stop Me", which charted at number 2 in the UK, top 5 of the US Dance charts, and in the top 40 of Italy and Australia. Upon its release, the album managed to crack into the World Top 40, charting at 29. Ronson's next single, "Oh My God" with Lily Allen, became his second top 10 single, peaking at 8 in the UK. "Valerie", Ronson's third single, also peaked at number 2 in the British charts, kept out of the top spot by the Sugababes. It has spent a dozen weeks in the top 10 and has sold well over 300,000 copies. The song ended the year as the ninth biggest seller, behind number 1's "Bleeding Love", "Umbrella", "Grace Kelly" among others. "Valerie" also charted in the Switzerland and New Zealand charts and even managed to top the Dutch Top 40 for four consecutive weeks, keeping Leona Lewis from the top spot. Ronson released "Just", featuring Alex Greenwald of Phantom Planet, as the fourth single in the United Kingdom. The song was quickly added to BBC Radio 1's "A-List".

Track listing

Personnel

Mark Ronson – guitar (tracks 1, 3, 4, 6–10 and 12–14), beats (tracks 1–4, 8, 9, 12 and 14), bass (tracks 1, 2, 4, 8 and 10), clavinet (tracks 2, 3, 10, 11 and 14), organ (tracks 1, 4, 6 and 11), percussion (tracks 7, 9 and 10), piano and handclaps (track 7), production, recording (tracks 1, 2, 4 and 7–14), recording assistance (tracks 3, 5 and 6)
Dave Guy – trumpet (tracks 1, 2 and 4–14)
Neal Sugarman – tenor saxophone (tracks 1, 2 and 4–14)
Sam Koppelman – percussion (tracks 1–4, 6, 8 and 11–14), drums (tracks 1 and 8)
Ian Hendrickson-Smith – baritone saxophone (tracks 1, 2, 4, 5 and 8–14)
Alex Gale – bass (tracks 2, 12 and 13)
Chris Elliott – string arrangements (tracks 3, 5 and 6), piano (track 6)
Boguslaw Kostecki – violin (tracks 3, 5 and 6)
Cathy Thompson – violin (tracks 3, 5 and 6)
Chris Tombling – violin (tracks 3, 5 and 6)
Emlyn Singleton – violin (tracks 3, 5 and 6)
Everton Nelson – violin (tracks 3, 5 and 6)
Gavyn Wright – violin (tracks 3, 5 and 6)
Perry Montague-Mason – violin (tracks 3, 5 and 6)
Rita Manning – violin (tracks 3, 5 and 6)
Tom Pigott-Smith – violin (tracks 3, 5 and 6)
Warren Zielinski – violin (tracks 3, 5 and 6)
Bruce White – viola (tracks 3, 5 and 6)
Garfield Jackson – viola (tracks 3, 5 and 6)
Peter Lale – viola (tracks 3, 5 and 6)
Rachel Bolt – viola (tracks 3, 5 and 6)
Homer Steinweiss – drums (tracks 5, 6 and 11)
Michael Tighe – guitar (tracks 2 and 4), vocals (track 4)
Stuart Zender – bass (tracks 3 and 6)
Thomas Brenneck – guitar (tracks 5 and 11)
Binky Griptite – guitar (tracks 5 and 11)
Nick Movshon – bass (tracks 5 and 11)
Cochemea Galecum – baritone saxophone (tracks 6 and 7)
Chris Scianni – guitar (tracks 12 and 13)
Jordan Galland – piano and electric piano (tracks 12 and 13)
The Daptone Horns – horns (track 1)
Lily Allen – vocals (track 2)
Daniel Merriweather – vocals (track 3)
Ben Chappell – cello (track 3)
Dave Daniels – cello (track 3)
Martin Loveday – cello (track 3)
Ol' Dirty Bastard – vocals (track 4)
Alia-Marie – backing vocals (track 4)
Cenophia Mitchell – backing vocals (track 4)
Amy Winehouse – vocals (track 5)
Questlove – percussion (track 5)
Paul Smith – vocals (track 6)
Matt Allchin – guitar (track 6)
Santigold – vocals (track 8)
Alex Greenwald – vocals and guitar (track 9)
Darren Robinson – guitar (track 9)
Sam Farrar – bass and recording (track 9)
Jeff Conrad – drums (track 9)
Kenna – vocals (track 10)
Robbie Williams – vocals (track 11)
Tom Meighan – vocals (track 13)
Sergio Pizzorno – guitar and backing vocals (track 13)
Christopher Karloff – guitar (track 13)
Chris Edwards – bass (track 13)
Ian Matthews – drums (track 13)
Raymond Angry – clavinet (track 14)
Derek Pacuk – recording (tracks 1, 2, 4 and 7–14), recording assistance (tracks 3, 5 and 6)
Dom Morley – recording (tracks 3, 5 and 6)
Gabriel Roth – recording (track 5)
Ian Gore – recording assistance (tracks 3, 5 and 6)
Rohan Onraet – recording assistance (tracks 3, 5 and 6)
Taz Mattar – recording assistance (tracks 3, 5 and 6)
John Hanes – additional Pro Tools engineering (tracks 1–4, 7, 8, 10 and 12–14)
Tim Roberts – engineering assistance (tracks 1–4, 7, 8, 10 and 12–14)
Serban Ghenea – mixing (tracks 1–4, 7, 8, 10 and 12–14)
Tom Elmhirst – mixing (tracks 5, 6 and 11)
Russell Elevado – mixing (track 9)
Dan Parry – mixing assistance (tracks 5 and 6)
Andy Marcinkowski – mixing assistance (track 6)
Steef Van De Gevel – mixing assistance (track 9)
Matt Paul – mixing assistance (track 11)

Charts

Weekly charts

Year-end charts

Release history

References

External links
 Version at Metacritic

2007 albums
Mark Ronson albums
Allido Records albums
Columbia Records albums
Covers albums
Albums produced by Mark Ronson